Hranitne is an inhabited locality in Ukraine and it may stand for:

Urban-type settlement
 Hranitne in Malyn Raion, Zhytomyr Oblast

Villages
 Hranitne in Volnovakha Raion, Donetsk Oblast;
 Hranitne in Sarny Raion, Rivne Oblast;
 Hranitne in  Chortkiv Raion, Ternopil Oblast;
 Hranitne in Nemyriv Raion, Vinnytsia Oblast.

Settlements
 Hranitne in Kamianske Raion, Dnipropetrovsk Oblast;
 Hranitne in Kryvyi Rih Raion, Dnipropetrovsk Oblast;
 Hranitne in Nikolske Raion, Donetsk Oblast.